The bar-sided forest-skink or barred-sided skink (Concinnia tenuis)  is a species of skink found in New South Wales and Queensland in Australia.

References

Concinnia
Reptiles described in 1831
Taxa named by John Edward Gray
Skinks of Australia